The Ruby River Basin Group is a geologic group in Montana. It preserves fossils dating back to the Paleogene period.

See also

 List of fossiliferous stratigraphic units in Montana
 Paleontology in Montana

References
 

Geologic groups of Montana
Paleogene stratigraphic units of North America